Casbas may refer to:

 Casbas Monastery
 Casbas de Huesca